Nioun Chin Elodie Li Yuk Lo (born 29 September 1982) is a Mauritian beach volleyball player. As of 2012, she plays with Natacha Rigobert. The pair participated in the 2012 Summer Olympics tournament and were eliminated after losing their three pool matches against Brazil, the Czech Republic and Germany finishing 19th overall after the games.

She was born in Port Louis, Mauritius.

References

External links
 

1982 births
Living people
People from Port Louis District
Mauritian beach volleyball players
Women's beach volleyball players
Beach volleyball players at the 2012 Summer Olympics
Olympic beach volleyball players of Mauritius
Mauritian people of Chinese descent
Hakka sportspeople
African Games gold medalists for Mauritius
African Games medalists in volleyball
Competitors at the 2011 All-Africa Games